Migration to New Zealand began with Polynesian settlement in New Zealand, then uninhabited, about 1250 to 1280. European migration provided a major influx following the signing of the Treaty of Waitangi in 1840. Subsequent immigration has been chiefly from the British Isles, but also from continental Europe, the Pacific, the Americas and Asia.

Polynesian settlement
Polynesians in the South Pacific were the first to discover the landmass of New Zealand. Eastern Polynesian explorers had settled in New Zealand by approximately the thirteenth century CE with most evidence pointing to an arrival date of about 1280. Their arrival gave rise to the Māori culture and the Māori language, both unique to New Zealand, although very closely related to analogues in other parts of Eastern Polynesia. Evidence from Wairau Bar and the Chatham Islands shows that the Polynesian colonists maintained many parts of their east Polynesian culture such as burial customs for at least 50 years. Especially strong resemblances link Māori to the languages and cultures of the Cook and Society Islands, which are regarded as the most likely places of origin. Moriori settled the Chatham Islands during the 15th century from mainland New Zealand.

European settlement
Due to New Zealand's geographic isolation, several centuries passed before the next phase of settlement, that of Europeans. Only then did the original inhabitants need to distinguish themselves from the new arrivals, using the adjective "māori" which means "ordinary" or "indigenous" which later became a noun although the term New Zealand native was common until about 1890. Māori thought of their tribe (iwi) as a nation.

James Cook claimed New Zealand for Britain on his arrival in 1769. The establishment of British colonies in Australia from 1788 and the boom in whaling and sealing in the Southern Ocean brought many Europeans to the vicinity of New Zealand, with some settling. Whalers and sealers were often itinerant and the first real settlers were missionaries and traders in the Bay of Islands area from 1809. By 1830 there was a population of about 800 non-Māori, which included about 200 runaway convicts and seamen who often married into the Māori community. The seamen often lived in New Zealand for a short time before joining another ship a few months later. In 1839 there were 1100 Europeans living in the North Island. Regular outbreaks of extreme violence, mainly between Māori hapu, known as the Musket Wars, resulted in the deaths of between 20,000 and 50,000 Māori up until 1843. Violence against European shipping, cannibalism and the lack of established law and order made settling in New Zealand a risky prospect. By the late 1830s many Māori were nominally Christian and had freed many of the Māori slaves that had been captured during the Musket Wars. By this time, many Māori, especially in the north, could read and write Māori and, to a lesser extent, English.

Migration from 1840

European migration has resulted in a deep legacy being left on the social and political structures of New Zealand. Early visitors to New Zealand included whalers, sealers, missionaries, mariners, and merchants, attracted to natural resources in abundance.

New Zealand was administered from New South Wales from 1788 and the first permanent settlers were Australians. Some were escaped convicts, and others were ex-convicts that had completed their sentences. Smaller numbers came directly from Great Britain, Ireland, Germany (forming the next biggest immigrant group after the British and Irish), France, Portugal, the Netherlands, Denmark, The United States, and Canada.

In 1840 representatives of the British Crown signed the Treaty of Waitangi with 240 Māori chiefs throughout New Zealand, motivated by plans for a French colony at Akaroa and land purchases by the New Zealand Company in 1839. British sovereignty was then proclaimed over New Zealand in May 1840 and by 1841 New Zealand had ceased being an Australian colony.

Following the formalising of sovereignty, organised and structured flow of migrants from Great Britain and Ireland began. Government-chartered ships like the clipper Gananoque and the Glentanner carried immigrants to New Zealand. Typically clipper ships left British ports such as London and travelled south through the central Atlantic to about 43 degrees south to pick up the strong westerly winds that carried the clippers well south of South Africa and Australia. Ships would then head north once in the vicinity of New Zealand. The Glentanner migrant ship of 610 tonnes made two runs to New Zealand and several to Australia carrying 400 tonne of passengers and cargo. Travel time was about 3 to  months to New Zealand. Cargo carried on the Glentanner for New Zealand included coal, slate, lead sheet, wine, beer, cart components, salt, soap and passengers' personal goods. On the 1857 passage the ship carried 163 official passengers, most of them government assisted. On the return trip the ship carried a wool cargo worth 45,000 pounds. In the 1860s discovery of gold started a gold rush in Otago. By 1860 more than 100,000 British and Irish settlers lived throughout New Zealand. The Otago Association actively recruited settlers from Scotland, creating a definite Scottish influence in that region, while the Canterbury Association recruited settlers from the south of England, creating a definite English influence over that region.

In the 1860s most migrants settled in the South Island due to gold discoveries and the availability of flat grass covered land for pastoral farming. The low number of Māori (about 2,000) and the absence of warfare gave the South Island many advantages. It was only when the New Zealand wars ended that the North Island again became an attractive destination.  In order to attract settlers to the North Island the Government and Auckland Provisional government initiated the Waikato Immigration Scheme which ran from 1864 and 1865. The central government originally intended to bring about 20,000 immigrants to the Waikato from the British Isles and the Cape Colony in South Africa to consolidate the government position after the wars and develop the Waikato area for European settlement. The immigration scheme settlers were allocated quarter-acre town sections and ten-acre rural sections. They were required to work on and improve the sections for two years after which a Crown Grant would be issued, giving them ownership. In all, 13 ships travelled to New Zealand under the scheme, arriving from London, Glasgow and Cape Town.

In the 1870s, Premier Julius Vogel borrowed millions of pounds from Britain to help fund capital development such as a nationwide rail system, lighthouses, ports and bridges, and encouraged mass migration from Britain. By 1870 the non-Māori population reached over 250,000.

Other smaller groups of settlers came from Germany, Scandinavia, and other parts of Europe as well as from China and India, but English, Scottish and Irish settlers made up the vast majority, and did so for the next 150 years. Today, the majority of New Zealanders have some sort of English, Scottish, Welsh and Irish ancestry. This comes with last names (mainly English, Irish, and Scottish) as well.

Between 1881 and the 1920s, the New Zealand Parliament passed legislation that intended to limit Asiatic migration to New Zealand, and prevented Asians from naturalising. In particular, the New Zealand government levied a poll tax on Chinese immigrants up until the 1930s. New Zealand finally abolished the poll tax in 1944. Large numbers of Dalmatians fled from the Austro- Hungarian empire to settle in New Zealand around 1900. They settled mainly in West Auckland and often worked to establish vineyards and orchards or worked on gum fields in Northland.

An influx of Jewish refugees from central Europe came in the 1930s.

Many of the persons of Polish descent in New Zealand arrived as orphans via Siberia and Iran during World War II.

Post World War II migration
With the various agencies of the United Nations dealing with humanitarian efforts following World War II, New Zealand accepted about 5,000 refugees and displaced persons from Europe, and more than 1,100 Hungarians between 1956 and 1959 (see Refugees in New Zealand). The post-WWII immigration included more people from Greece, Italy, Poland and the former Yugoslavia.

New Zealand limited immigration to those who would meet a labour shortage in New Zealand. To encourage those to come, the government introduced free and assisted passages in 1947, a scheme expanded by the National Party administration in 1950. However, when it became clear that not enough skilled migrants would come from the British Isles alone, recruitment began in Northern European countries. New Zealand signed a bilateral agreement for skilled migrants with the Netherlands, and a large number of Dutch immigrants arrived in New Zealand. Others came in the 1950s from Denmark, Germany, Switzerland and Austria to meet needs in specialised occupations.

A Department of External Affairs memorandum in 1953 stated: "Our immigration is based firmly on the principle that we are and intend to remain a country of European development. It is inevitably discriminatory against Asians—indeed against all persons who are not wholly of European race and colour. Whereas we have done much to encourage immigration from Europe, we do everything to discourage it from Asia."

By the 1960s, the policy of excluding people based on nationality yielded a population overwhelmingly European in origin. By the mid-1960s, a desire for cheap unskilled labour led to ethnic diversification. Consequently, New Zealand encouraged migrants from the South Pacific. The country had a large demand for unskilled labour in the manufacturing sector. As long as this demand continued, migration was accepted from the South Pacific, and many temporary workers overstayed their visas. Consequently, the Pacific Island population in New Zealand had grown to 45,413 by 1971. The economic crisis of the early 1970s led to increased crime, unemployment and other social ailments, which disproportionately affected the Pacific Islander community.

A record number of migrants arrived in the 1970s; 70,000, for example, during 1973–1974. While these numbers represent many ethnicities, New Zealand had an underlying preference for migrants from "traditional sources", namely Britain, Europe and North America, due to similarities of language and culture.

Skills-based immigration, 1980s–present

Increased multiculturalism

Along with New Zealand adopting a radical direction of economic practice, Parliament passed a new Immigration Act into law in 1987. This would end the preference for migrants from Britain, Europe or Northern America based on their race, and instead classify migrants on their skills, personal qualities, and potential contribution to New Zealand economy and society. The introduction of the points-based system came under the National government, which pursued this policy-change even more than the previous Labour Party administration. This system resembled that of Canada, and came into effect in 1991. Effectively the New Zealand Immigration Service ranks the qualities sought in the migrants and gives them a priority using a points-based scale. In 2010 the new Immigration Act replaced all existing protocols and procedures.

The shift towards a skills-based immigration system resulted in a wide variety of ethnicities in New Zealand, with people from over 120 countries represented. Between 1991 and 1995 the numbers of those given approval grew rapidly: 26,000 in 1992; 35,000 in 1994; 54,811 in 1995. The minimum target for residency approval was set at 25,000. The number approved was almost twice what was targeted. The Labour-led governments of 1999–2008 made no change to the Immigration Act 1987, although some changes were made} to the 1991 policy.

In December 2002, the minimum IELTS level for skilled migrants was raised from 5.5 to 6.5 in 2002, following concerns that immigrants who spoke English as a second language encountered difficulty getting jobs in their chosen fields. Since then, migration from Britain and South Africa has increased, at the expense of immigration from Asia. However, a study-for-residency programme for foreign university students has mitigated this imbalance somewhat.

In 2004–2005 Immigration New Zealand set a target of 45,000, representing 1.5% of the total population. However, the net effect was a population decline, since more left than arrived. 48,815 arrived, and overall the population was 10,000 or 0.25% less than the previous year. Overall though, New Zealand has one of the highest populations of foreign born citizens. In 2005, almost 20% of New Zealanders were born overseas, one of the highest percentages of any country in the world.

Subsequent amendments
The Department of Labour's sixth annual Migration Trends report showed a 21 per cent rise in work permits issued in the 2005/06-year compared with the previous year. Nearly 100,000 people were issued work permits to work in sectors ranging from IT to horticulture in the 2005/06-year. This compares with around 35,000 work permits issued in 1999–2000. Around 52,000 people were approved for permanent New Zealand residence in 2005/06. Over 60 per cent were approved under the skilled or business categories.

By 2005, New Zealand had accepted 60% of the applicants under the Skilled/Business category that awarded points for qualifications and work experience, or business experience and funds they had available.

In December 2006, the New Zealand Government published the results of an immigration review.

Changes to the point system have also given more weight to job offers as compared to educational degrees. Some Aucklanders cynically joke that most taxi drivers in Auckland tend to be highly qualified engineers or doctors who are unable to then find jobs in their fields once in the country.

In May 2008, Massey University economist Dr Greg Clydesdale released to the news media an extract of a report, Growing Pains, Evaluations and the Cost of Human Capital, which claimed that Pacific Islanders were "forming an underclass". The report, written by Dr Clydesdale for the "Academy of World Business, Marketing & Management Development 2008 Conference" in Brazil, and based on data from various government departments, provoked highly controversial debate. Pacific Islands community leaders and academic peer reviewers strongly criticised the report, while a provisional review was lodged by Race Relations Commissioner Joris de Bres.

Tightening immigration criteria
In March 2012, a draft paper leaked to the New Zealand Labour Party showed that Immigration New Zealand was planning to create a two-tier system which would favour wealthy immigrants over poor ones who spoke little or no English. This means that applications from parents sponsored by their higher income children, or those who bring a guaranteed income or funds, would be processed faster than other applications.

During the 2017 New Zealand general election the New Zealand First party campaigned on cutting net immigration to 10,000 per year. NZ First leader Winston Peters said that unemployed New Zealanders would be trained to take jobs as the number is reduced, and the number of older immigrants will be limited, with more encouraged to settle in the regions. 

According to Statistics New Zealand estimates, New Zealand's net migration (long-term arrivals minus long-term departures) in the June 2016/17 year was 72,300. That was up from 38,300 in the June 2013/14 year. Of those migrants specifying a region of settlement, 61 percent settled in the Auckland region.

In May 2022, Prime Minister Jacinda Ardern announced that the Government would be introducing a new "green list" to attract migrants for "high-skilled" and "hard-to-fill" positions from 4 July 2022. Green list applicants would have streamlined residency pathways. The exclusion of nurses, teachers, and dairy farm managers from the visa residency "green list" was also criticised by the New Zealand Nurses Organisation, the Secondary Principals' Association, and Federated Farmers. In early August 2022, the Government acknowledged that it had not consulted professional nursing bodies and the district health boards about its nursing "green list" visa scheme. On 8 August, the Ministry of Business, Innovation and Employment admitted that only nine nurses had applied for the Green List visa residency scheme by late July 2022.

In addition, the Government also revised its student visa policy to limit the working rights of international student holders to degree-level students and above and prevent applications from applying for a second post-study work visa in order to gain residency.

In December 2022, the Government added nurses and midwives to the immigration green list, making them eligible for immediate residency in New Zealand. In addition, the Government established a temporary residence immigration pathway for bus and truck drivers. In addition teachers and tradespeople including drain layers and motor mechanics were added to the work to residence immigration pathway. These changes came in response to a national labour shortage across different sectors in the New Zealand economy.

Key legislation and policies
Contemporary regulations state that immigrants must be of good character.

Immigration Advisers Licensing Act 2007
Effective in New Zealand from 4 May 2007, the Immigration Advisers Licensing Act requires anyone providing immigration advice to be licensed. It also established the Immigration Advisers Authority to manage the licensing process, both in New Zealand and offshore.

From 4 May 2009 it became mandatory for immigration advisers practising in New Zealand to be licensed unless they are exempt. The introduction of mandatory licensing for New Zealand-based immigration advisers was designed to protect migrants from unscrupulous operators and provide support for licensed advisers.

The licensing managed by the Immigration Advisers Authority Official website establishes and monitors industry standards and sets requirements for continued professional development. As an independent body, the Authority can prosecute unlicensed immigration advisers. Penalties include up to seven years imprisonment and/or fines up to $NZ100,000 for offenders, as well as the possibility of court-ordered reparation payments. It can refer complaints made against licensed advisers to an Independent Tribunal, i.e. Immigration Advisers Complaints & Disciplinary Tribunal.

The Immigration Advisers Authority does not handle immigration applications or inquiries. These are managed by Immigration New Zealand.

Immigration Act 2009
Statements by the government in the mid 2000s emphasised that New Zealand must compete for its share of skilled and talented migrants, and David Cunliffe, the former immigration minister, has argued that New Zealand was "in a global race for talent and we must win our share".

With this in mind, a bill (over 400 pages long) was prepared which was sent to Parliament in April 2007. It follows a review of the immigration act. The bill aims to make the process more efficient, and achieves this by giving more power to immigration officers. Rights of appeal were to be streamlined into a single appeal tribunal. Furthermore, any involvement of the Human Rights Commission in matters of immigration to New Zealand would be removed (Part 11, Clause 350).

The new Immigration Act, which passed into law in 2009 replacing the 1987 Act, is aimed at enhancing border security and improving the efficiency of the immigration services. Key aspects of the new Act include the ability to use biometrics, a new refugee and protection system, a single independent appeals tribunal and a universal visa system.

Other migrant quotas
New Zealand accepts 1000 refugees per year (set to grow to 1500 by 1 July 2020) in co-operation with the UNHCR with a strong focus on the Asia-Pacific region. 

As part of the Pacific Access Category, 650 citizens come from Fiji, Tuvalu, Kiribati, and Tonga. 1,100 Samoan citizens come under the Samoan Quota scheme. Once resident, these people can apply to bring other family members to New Zealand under the Family Sponsored stream. Any migrant accepted under these schemes receives permanent residency in New Zealand.

Issues and controversies

Public opinion
As in some other countries, immigration can become a contentious issue; the topic has provoked debate from time to time in New Zealand.

As early as the 1870s, political opponents fought against Vogel's immigration plans.

The political party New Zealand First (founded in 1993) has frequently criticised immigration on economic, social and cultural grounds. New Zealand First leader Winston Peters has on several occasions characterised the rate of Asian immigration into New Zealand as too high; in 2004, he stated: "We are being dragged into the status of an Asian colony and it is time that New Zealanders were placed first in their own country." On 26 April 2005, he said: "Māori will be disturbed to know that in 17 years' time they will be outnumbered by Asians in New Zealand" – an estimate disputed by Statistics New Zealand, the government's statistics bureau. Peters quickly rebutted that Statistics New Zealand had underestimated the growth-rate of the Asian community in the past.

In April 2008, then deputy New Zealand First Party leader Peter Brown drew widespread attention after voicing similar views and expressing concern at the increase in New Zealand's ethnic Asian population: "We are going to flood this country with Asian people with no idea what we are going to do with them when they come here." "The matter is serious. If we continue this open door policy there is real danger we will be inundated with people who have no intention of integrating into our society. The greater the number, the greater the risk. They will form their own mini-societies to the detriment of integration and that will lead to division, friction and resentment."

Overstayers and deportations
Between 1974 to 1979, dawn raids were carried out by the New Zealand Police to remove overstayers. These raids controversially targeted Pacific Islanders; many of whom had migrated to the New Zealand during the 1950s and 1960s due to a demand for labour to fuel the country's economic development.  While Pacific Islanders comprised one-third of overstayers, they accounted for 86% of those arrested and prosecuted.  In response to domestic opposition, criticism from New Zealand's Pacific neighbours, and the failure of the raids to ease New Zealand's economic problems, the Third National Government ended the Dawn Raids in 1979.

In 2000, the Fifth Labour Government granted an amnesty to 7,000 long-term overstayers, which allowed them to apply for New Zealand citizenship. In 2020, three separate petitions seeking an amnesty for overstayers and other changes to help migrants were submitted to the New Zealand Parliament. According to figures released by the Ministry of Business, Innovation and Employment (MBIE) in 2017, the top five nationalities with the highest number of overstayers in New Zealand were Tongans (2,498), Samoans (1,549), Chinese (1,529), Indians (1,310), and Malaysians (790).  These individuals were temporary visa holders who had either not returned to their home countries once their visas had expired, renewed them, or upgraded them to residency visas. Overstayers can appeal their deportation notices to the Immigration and Protection Tribunal which has granted residency on humanitarian grounds such as family connections to New Zealand.

In February 2022, a study published by Unitec Institute of Technology estimated there were between 13,000 and 14,000 overstayers or undocumented migrants in New Zealand, citing an interview with Immigration New Zealand Stephen Vaughan. This figure included around 500-600 Tuvaluans. These overstayers are people who have overstayed their work and study visas and been unable to renew them. Many of these overstayers have trouble accessing education, health, and social services due to their undocumented status.

In February 2022, a report published by the Australian think tank Lowy Institute found that New Zealand had deported 1,040 people to the Pacific Islands between 2013 and 2018. Of this number, 400 were criminals including members of the Head Hunters Motorcycle Club. The report's author Jose Sousa-Santos argued that New Zealand, Australia and the United States' deportation policies were fuelling a spike in organised crime and drug trafficking in several Pacific countries including Samoa, Tonga, Fiji, Kiribati, Nauru, Tuvalu and Vanuatu. The Sousa-Santos report estimated that most of the deportees were males between the ages of 25 and 35 years, who had spent more than twelve years away from their countries of origin. Several had connections to organised crime in their former host countries. In response to the Sousa-Santos report, Immigration Minister Kris Faafoi stated that the New Zealand Government carefully considered deportations including family and individual circumstances while retaining the right to deport those who had breached their visa conditions and the law while living and working in New Zealand.

Repatriation to New Zealand
In December 2014, Peter Dutton became the new Australian Minister for Immigration and Border Protection. That same month, the Australian Government amended the Migration Act 1958 to impose a character test (known as Section 501) on non-citizens and visa applications. Under the new law, individuals who had served a prison term of at least twelve months are eligible to have their visas cancelled and be deported. Prior to 2015, Australia had deported between 50 and 85 New Zealanders per year. As Immigration Minister, Dutton swiftly implemented the new character test policy. Between 1 January 2015 and 30 August 2019, 1,865 New Zealanders were repatriated back to New Zealand. In addition, the number of New Zealanders held at Australian immigration detention centres rose to 300 in 2015. By December 2019, New Zealand nationals accounted for over half (roughly 51-56%) of Australian visa cancellations.

Australia has a large New Zealand diaspora community, which numbered 650,000 as of December 2019. While New Zealanders are eligible for a non-permanent Special Category Visa (SCV) which allows them unique rights to live and work in Australia, SCV holders are ineligible for Australian social security benefits, student loans, and lack a clear path to acquiring Australian citizenship. Following a tightening of Australian immigration policies in 2001, New Zealanders residing in Australia were required to obtain permanent residency before applying for Australian citizenship, which led to a decline in the number of New Zealanders acquiring Australian citizenship. By 2016, only 8.4 per cent of the 146,000 New Zealand–born migrants who arrived in Australia between 2002 and 2011 had acquired Australian citizenship. Of this figure, only 3 per cent of New Zealand–born Māori had acquired Australian citizenship by 2018. During that same period the number of New Zealand-born prisoners in Australian prisons rose by 42% between 2009 and 2016.

Following high-level meetings between New Zealand Prime Minister John Key and his Australian counterparts Tony Abbott and Malcolm Turnbull, the Australian Government agreed to give New Zealand authorities more warning about the repatriation of deportees and to allow New Zealanders detained at Australian immigration detention centres to fly home while they appealed their visa cancellations. The Fifth National Government also passed Returning Offenders (Management and Information) Act 2015 in November 2015 which established a strict monitoring returning for 501 returnees. The law allows the chief executive of the Department of Corrections to apply to a district court to impose special conditions on returning prisoners including submitting photographs and fingerprints. While the Returning Offenders Act's strict monitoring regime reduced  recidivism rates from 58% in November 2015 to 38% by March 2018, the New Zealand Law Society expressed concern that the Act potentially violated the New Zealand Bill of Rights Act 1990 by imposing "retroactive penalties and double jeopardy" on former offenders.

In December 2019, Stuff reported that a total of 1,865 New Zealanders had been deported from Australia between January 2015 and August 2019. Since many former deportees lacked family ties, jobs, or homes in New Zealand, many subsequently relapsed into criminal behaviour. According to figures released by the New Zealand Police, one third of these deportees had been convicted of at least one offense since their arrival including dishonesty (1,065), traffic offenses (789), violence (578), and drugs/anti-social behaviour (394). In addition, the repatriation of New Zealanders led to a surge in organised criminal activity in New Zealand. Several repatriated members of Australian bikie gangs including the Comanchero and Mongols expanded their operations. According to Detective Superintendent Greg Williams, the repatriated "bikies" introduced a new level of "professionalism, criminal tradecraft, encrypted technologies and significant international connections" to the New Zealand criminal underworld. In addition to boosting the methamphetamine black market, the Comanchero and Mongols used social media and luxury goods to recruit young people.

By early March 2022, 2,544 New Zealanders had been repatriated from Australia, which accounted for 96% of deportations to New Zealand since 2015. The repatriation of New Zealanders from Australia led to a surge in crime in New Zealand. According to Newshub, former 501 deportees accounted for more than 8,000 offences since 2015 including over 2,000 dishonesty convictions, 1,387 violent crime convictions, 861 drug and anti-social behavior offenses and 57 sexual crime offenses. Both Police Commissioner Andrew Coster and New Zealand National Party leader Christopher Luxon attributed the increasingly aggressive nature of the New Zealand criminal underworld and growth in gang membership to the influx of former 501 deportees.

On 20 December 2022, High Court Judge Cheryl Gwyn ruled in favour of a former 501 deportee known as "G," who successfully challenged the Government's authority to impose special conditions upon his return to New Zealand. Gwyn ruled that special conditions such as ordering "G" to reside at a particularly address, supplying fingerprints and DNA, and attending rehabilitative and treatment programmes violated the New Zealand Bill of Rights Act 1990 and constituted an act of double jeopardy since he had already served time for crimes in Australia which had led to his repatriation to New Zealand. Gwyn's decision has implications for the Returning Offenders (Management and Information) Act 2015, which allowed the New Zealand Government to impose special conditions on returning prisoners. On 21 December, the Crown Law Office appealed against Gwyn's High Court ruling, citing its implications on the monitoring regime established by the Returning Offenders (Management and Information) Act 2015.

Statistics

See also
 Pākehā settlers
 Demographics of New Zealand
 Europeans in Oceania
 Chinese immigration to New Zealand
 The Vogel Era

References

Bibliography
 King, Michael, 2003, The Penguin History of New Zealand, Penguin, Auckland
 McMillan, K., 2006, "Immigration Policy", pp. 639–650 in New Zealand Government and Politics, ed. R. Miller, AUP
 
 History of Immigration at Te Ara: The Encyclopedia of New Zealand
 News release from Caritas NZ

External links
 Immigration New Zealand
 Immigration Advisers Authority
 New Zealand immigration statistics
 Immigration & Protection Tribunal
 Immigration Advisers Complaints & Disciplinary Tribunal